Samsaram Adhu Minsaram is a 1986 Indian Tamil-language drama film produced by AVM Productions, and written and directed by Visu. He also stars as part of an ensemble cast including Lakshmi, Chandrasekhar, Kishmu, Raghuvaran, Delhi Ganesh, Ilavarasi, Manorama, Madhuri, Kamala Kamesh, Dilip and Haja Sheriff. The film revolves around the splintering of a joint family, and the efforts made by the patriarch's eldest daughter-in-law to reunite them.

The story of Samsaram Adhu Minsaram was inspired by Visu's play Uravukku Kai Koduppom, which had already been adapted into a 1975 film. Despite the failure of that film, producer M. Saravanan liked the story, so it was reinvented into Samsaram Adhu Minsaram. The film was made on a then shoestring budget of ₹1.5 million, and the whole crew worked for 35 days. Cinematography was handled by N. Balakrishnan, and editing by A. Paul Duraisingham.

Samsaram Adhu Minsaram released on 18 July 1986. The film received critical acclaim and ran for 25 weeks in theatres. It won the National Film Award for Best Popular Film Providing Wholesome Entertainment (the first Tamil film to do so), the Filmfare Award for Best Tamil Film, three Cinema Express Awards (including Best Tamil Film and Best Tamil Actress for Lakshmi) and the Filmfans Association Awards for Best Film. In 1987, the film was remade in Hindi as Sansar, in Telugu as Samsaram Oka Chadarangam, in Kannada as Onde Goodina Hakkigalu, and in 1988 in Malayalam as Kudumbapuranam.

Plot 
Ammaiyappan Mudaliar, a government clerk, lives with his wife Godavari, sons Chidambaram, Siva and Bharathi, daughter Sarojini and Chidambaram's wife Uma. As Ammaiyappan struggles to manage the needs of his joint family with his meagre income, his two elder sons supplement it by contributing to the family kitty. He plans to get Sarojini married and invites the prospective groom's family for a prenuptial meeting.

The conceited Sarojini rebukes the guests, and declares her plan to marry her colleague Peter Fernandez. The entire family initially opposes her decision as they are Hindus and Peter is a Christian. Ammaiyappan meets with Peter's father Albert, and realises that they are genuine humans, and both families ultimately agree on the wedding. Ammaiyappan meets and apologises to the rejected groom's father. Impressed with Ammaiyappan and his family, he offers to get his daughter Vasantha married to Siva. Both weddings take place happily. Uma, pregnant with her first child, goes to her maternal home for delivering the child.

Bharathi fails his twelfth grade exams for the fourth time, and is beaten severely by Siva. Later, he vows to pass within a year, and seeks help from Vasantha who is a graduate. But within weeks, Vasantha struggles to adjust to the new environment as she gets little privacy to be with Siva as Bharathi seeks her help for tutoring even at late night and the family chores are keeping her busy in the day. Unable to cope, one early morning she returns to her father, without informing anyone. Sarojini returns the same morning to Ammaiyappan after a fight with Peter as she prioritises socialising over domestic responsibilities. Siva visits Vasantha's father, who is berating Vasantha. The duo then walk home, when Siva tells her to either wait a few more months, for privacy, or let go of him. Vasantha returns to Siva's home, while Siva leaves for work.

That same day, Chidambaram halves his monthly contribution to the family, citing Uma's absence. An argument erupts between him and Ammaiyappan. Upset with Chidambaram's tightfistedness on spending money for his siblings and parents, Ammaiyappan orders him to vacate the house. In turn, Chidambaram demands the 18000 he had spent for Sarojini's wedding with interest for him to leave. Deeply insulted, Ammaiyappan draws a white-line splitting the house into two halves and announces that no one from either side should cross it or communicate with members of the other side. He also declares Chidambaram's family has to reside in one side, and Ammaiyappan will pay net sum of 20000 within 12 months for Chidambaram to vacate the house. The only person with access to both sides is the maidservant Kannamma.

Uma later returns with her child and is shocked with the developments at home. She is sad to see Sarojini back and an unhappy Vasantha. Uma takes the help of Albert and Kannamma to reunite Sarojini and Peter, and advises Siva to take Vasantha on a sojourn to rejuvenate his relationship with his wife. Bharathi also passes his exams. Though the problems are sorted out, Uma is upset that her brothers-in-law are still abiding by their father's order and not talking to her. Kannamma cajoles Ammaiyappan not to be very adamant and forgive his son.

Chidambaram, meanwhile, ends up spending more money per head for his small family after the separation, than what he allocated when they were together with the extended family. So he reconsiders his decision to live separately and decides to reunite with his father. However, Uma disagrees as once the bonding is broken for the sake of money, it cannot be restored exactly to its original state. She states that they may not rejoin for the sake of money and any bonding should be based on unconditional love. She recommends living separately but on talking terms, celebrating weekends and festivals as the best way to live peacefully, for which her husband agrees, and they move out the same evening.

Cast 

 Lakshmi as Uma
 Chandrasekhar as Siva
 Kishmu as Albert Fernandes
 Raghuvaran as Chidambaran
 Delhi Ganesh as Vasantha's father
 Ilavarasi as Sarojini
 Manorama as Kannamma
 Madhuri as Vasantha
 Kamala Kamesh as Godavari

 Dilip as Peter Fernandes
 Haja Sheriff as Bharathi
 Omakuchi Narasimhan as Matchmaker
Visu as Ammaiyappan Mudaliar

Production 
After writing Nallavanukku Nallavan (1984) for AVM Productions, Visu told M. Saravanan of AVM his wish that they finance his next film. Saravanan agreed, and stipulated that Visu work exclusively on that film till completion. Visu narrated some stories, but Saravanan was not pleased with any of them; he wanted a "neat family story", similar to Visu's earlier films like Kudumbam Oru Kadambam (1981). Visu narrated the story that would later be titled Samsaram Adhu Minsaram, and an impressed Saravanan asked why he had not done so before. He replied that the story was derived from his play Uravukku Kai Koduppom, which had already been adapted into a 1975 film produced by K. S. Gopalakrishnan that was not successful. However, since Saravanan liked the story, he said they could reinvent it, and bought the story from Gopalakrishnan.

The character of the maidservant Kannamma, played by Manorama, was created specifically for the film by Visu, at Saravanan's insistence; Visu was initially reluctant, feeling the comical character would dilute the story. When it came to titling the film, Visu came up with roughly twelve titles and asked Saravanan which one he liked. Saravanan chose Samsaram Adhu Minsaram, because he felt it was filled with "freshness". Cinematography was handled by N. Balakrishnan, and editing by A. Paul Duraisingham. It was filmed using ORWOcolor, to reduce production costs.

Themes 
Visu has stated that Samsaram Adhu Minsaram was inspired by his own upbringing in a joint family, saying that by growing up in such an environment, he "observed how each person had a difference of opinion. It wasn't bad; just that we were different. I wondered, ‘Wouldn't other joint families have similar issues?’ So I started writing scripts that reflect the day-to-day scenario in a joint family" such as this. The children of Ammaiyappan are named after historical figures, primarily those involved in fighting for India's independence from the British Raj such as Chidambaran (V. O. Chidambaram Pillai), Siva (Subramaniya Siva), Sarojini (Sarojini Naidu) and Bharathi (Subramania Bharati). According to S. Srivatsan of The Hindu, the characters of Samsaram Adhu Minsaram "deliver a larger point on familial values without romanticising the social conditions in which they live". He also felt that, despite the main plot being about the conflict between Ammaiyappan and Chidambaram, Uma is the "nucleus" of the film and "the rest of the characters are treated as protons and neutrons, orbiting around Uma".

Soundtrack 
The music was composed by Shankar–Ganesh, with lyrics by Vairamuthu.

Release and reception 
Samsaram Adhu Minsaram was released on 18 July 1986, and received critical acclaim. Ananda Vikatan, in its review dated 27 July 1986, said Visu had moved into his domain of middle-class family issues based films and brought out an excellent film, calling it a tasty food from AVM. Jeyamanmadhan of Kalki wrote that one thing was very clear: Visu's handed over masala was a family story. The film ran for 25 weeks in theatres, becoming a silver jubilee hit, and distributors received profits worth 10 times the buying price. M. G. Ramachandran, then the Chief Minister of Tamil Nadu, was chief guest for the silver jubilee function.

Accolades 
Samsaram Adhu Minsaram was the first Tamil film to win the National Film Award for Best Popular Film Providing Wholesome Entertainment.

Remakes 
Samsaram Adhu Minsaram was remade in Hindi as Sansar (1987), in Telugu as Samsaram Oka Chadarangam (1987), in Kannada as Onde Goodina Hakkigalu (1987), and in Malayalam as Kudumbapuranam (1988).

Legacy 
One of the most popular scenes in Samsaram Adhu Minsaram was that where Kannamma and Albert Fernandes enact a drama to reunite Sarojini and Peter.

References

Bibliography

External links 
 
 

1980s Tamil-language films
1986 drama films
1986 films
AVM Productions films
Best Popular Film Providing Wholesome Entertainment National Film Award winners
Films about families
Films based on adaptations
Films directed by Visu
Films scored by Shankar–Ganesh
Films with screenplays by Visu
Indian drama films
Tamil films remade in other languages